Marr Glacier is a glacier  west of Goldman Glacier, flowing north from the Kukri Hills into Taylor Valley, Victoria Land, Antarctica. It was charted by the British Antarctic Expedition under Robert Falcon Scott, 1910–13, who it appears also applied the name.

References

Glaciers of Victoria Land
McMurdo Dry Valleys